Avenches District is a former district of the Canton of Vaud, Switzerland. The seat of the district was the town of Avenches.  It was dissolved on 31 August 2006 and all the municipalities joined the new Broye-Vully District.

The following municipalities are located in the district:

 Avenches
 Bellerive
 Chabrey
 Constantine
 Cudrefin
 Donatyre
 Faoug
 Montmagny
 Mur
 Oleyres
 Vallamand
 Villars-le-Grand

On 1 July 2006, Donatyre became part of the municipality of Avenches.

References

Former districts of the canton of Vaud